The  Washington Redskins season was the franchise's 20th season in the National Football League (NFL) and their 14th in Washington, D.C.  The team improved on their 3–9 record from 1950 and finished 5-7.

Schedule

Standings

Washington
Washington Redskins seasons
Washing